Isabelle Rampling (born June 24, 1985) is a Canadian synchronized swimmer.

Career
At the 2006 Commonwealth Games, Rampling won a gold medal, which she followed up with two silver medals at the 2007 Pan American Games. At the 2008 Summer Olympics, she placed sixth with partner Marie-Pier Boudreau Gagnon in the duet.

In 2017, she was selected to compete at the World Championships in the mixed duet event with Robert Prévost. Her name was reported to be Isabelle Blanchet-Rampling (she formerly competed under the name Isabelle Rampling).

References

1985 births
Living people
Canadian synchronized swimmers
Olympic synchronized swimmers of Canada
Commonwealth Games gold medallists for Canada
Synchronised swimmers at the 2006 Commonwealth Games
Synchronized swimmers at the 2007 Pan American Games
Synchronized swimmers at the 2008 Summer Olympics
Swimmers from Toronto
Commonwealth Games medallists in synchronised swimming
Pan American Games medalists in synchronized swimming
Pan American Games silver medalists for Canada
Medalists at the 2007 Pan American Games
20th-century Canadian women
21st-century Canadian women
Medallists at the 2006 Commonwealth Games